In mathematics, the Dirac delta distribution ( distribution), also known as the unit impulse, is a generalized function or distribution over the real numbers, whose value is zero everywhere except at zero, and whose integral over the entire real line is equal to one.

The current understanding of the unit impulse is as a linear functional that maps every continuous function (e.g.) to its value at zero of its domain, or as the weak limit of a sequence of bump functions (e.g.), which are zero over most of the real line, with a tall spike at the origin. Bump functions are thus sometimes called "approximate" or "nascent" delta distributions.

The delta function was introduced by physicist Paul Dirac as a tool for the normalization of state vectors. It also has uses in probability theory and signal processing. Its validity was disputed until Laurent Schwartz developed the theory of distributions where it is defined as a linear form acting on functions.

The Kronecker delta function, which is usually defined on a discrete domain and takes values 0 and 1, is the discrete analog of the Dirac delta function.

Motivation and overview 
The graph of the Dirac delta is usually thought of as following the whole x-axis and the positive y-axis.  The Dirac delta is used to model a tall narrow spike function (an impulse), and other similar abstractions such as a point charge, point mass or electron point. For example, to calculate the dynamics of a billiard ball being struck, one can approximate the force of the impact by a Dirac delta.  In doing so, one not only simplifies the equations, but one also is able to calculate the motion of the ball by only considering the total impulse of the collision without a detailed model of all of the elastic energy transfer at subatomic levels (for instance).

To be specific, suppose that a billiard ball is at rest. The exchange of momentum is not actually instantaneous, being mediated by elastic processes at the molecular and subatomic level, but for practical purposes it is convenient to consider that energy transfer as effectively instantaneous.

To model this situation more rigorously, suppose that the force instead is uniformly distributed over a small time interval .  That is,

Then the momentum at any time t is found by integration:

Here the functions  are thought of as useful approximations to the idea of instantaneous transfer of momentum.

The delta function allows us to construct an idealized limit of these approximations. Unfortunately, the actual limit of the functions (in the sense of pointwise convergence)  is zero everywhere but a single point, where it is infinite. To make proper sense of the Dirac delta, we should instead insist that the property

which holds for all , should continue to hold in the limit. So, in the equation , it is understood that the limit is always taken outside the integral.

In applied mathematics, as we have done here, the delta function is often manipulated as a kind of limit (a weak limit) of a sequence of functions, each member of which has a tall spike at the origin: for example, a sequence of Gaussian distributions centered at the origin with variance tending to zero.

The Dirac delta is not truly a function, at least not a usual one with domain and range in real numbers. A rigorous approach to regarding the Dirac delta function as a mathematical object in its own right requires measure theory or the theory of distributions.

History
Joseph Fourier presented what is now called the Fourier integral theorem in his treatise Théorie analytique de la chaleur in the form:

which is tantamount to the introduction of the δ-function in the form:

Later, Augustin Cauchy expressed the theorem using exponentials:

Cauchy pointed out that in some circumstances the order of integration is significant in this result (contrast Fubini's theorem).

As justified using the theory of distributions, the Cauchy equation can be rearranged to resemble Fourier's original formulation and expose the δ-function as

where the δ-function is expressed as

A rigorous interpretation of the exponential form and the various limitations upon the function f necessary for its application extended over several centuries. The problems with a classical interpretation are explained as follows:
 The greatest drawback of the classical Fourier transformation is a rather narrow class of functions (originals) for which it can be effectively computed. Namely, it is necessary that these functions decrease sufficiently rapidly to zero (in the neighborhood of infinity) to ensure the existence of the Fourier integral. For example, the Fourier transform of such simple functions as polynomials does not exist in the classical sense. The extension of the classical Fourier transformation to distributions considerably enlarged the class of functions that could be transformed and this removed many obstacles.

Further developments included generalization of the Fourier integral, "beginning with Plancherel's pathbreaking L2-theory (1910), continuing with Wiener's and Bochner's works (around 1930) and culminating with the amalgamation into L. Schwartz's theory of distributions (1945) ...", and leading to the formal development of the Dirac delta function.

An infinitesimal formula for an infinitely tall, unit impulse delta function (infinitesimal version of Cauchy distribution) explicitly appears in an 1827 text of Augustin Louis Cauchy.  Siméon Denis Poisson considered the issue in connection with the study of wave propagation as did Gustav Kirchhoff somewhat later. Kirchhoff and Hermann von Helmholtz also introduced the unit impulse as a limit of Gaussians, which also corresponded to Lord Kelvin's notion of a point heat source.  At the end of the 19th century, Oliver Heaviside used formal Fourier series to manipulate the unit impulse. The Dirac delta function as such was introduced by Paul Dirac in his 1927 paper The Physical Interpretation of the Quantum Dynamics and used in his textbook The Principles of Quantum Mechanics.  He called it the "delta function" since he used it as a continuous analogue of the discrete Kronecker delta.

Definitions
The Dirac delta can be loosely thought of as a function on the real line which is zero everywhere except at the origin, where it is infinite,

 

and which is also constrained to satisfy the identity

This is merely a heuristic characterization. The Dirac delta is not a function in the traditional sense as no function defined on the real numbers has these properties. The Dirac delta function can be rigorously defined either as a distribution or as a measure.

As a measure
One way to rigorously capture the notion of the Dirac delta function is to define a measure, called Dirac measure, which accepts a subset  of the real line  as an argument, and returns  if , and  otherwise.  If the delta function is conceptualized as modeling an idealized point mass at 0, then  represents the mass contained in the set .  One may then define the integral against  as the integral of a function against this mass distribution.  Formally, the Lebesgue integral provides the necessary analytic device.  The Lebesgue integral with respect to the measure  satisfies

 

for all continuous compactly supported functions .  The measure  is not absolutely continuous with respect to the Lebesgue measure—in fact, it is a singular measure.  Consequently, the delta measure has no Radon–Nikodym derivative (with respect to Lebesgue measure)—no true function for which the property

holds.  As a result, the latter notation is a convenient abuse of notation, and not a standard (Riemann or Lebesgue) integral.

This means that  is the integral of the cumulative indicator function  with respect to the measure ; to wit,

the latter being the measure of this interval; more formally, .
Thus in particular the integration of the delta function against a continuous function can be properly understood as a Riemann–Stieltjes integral:

In particular, characteristic function and moment generating function are both equal to one.

As a distribution
In the theory of distributions, a generalized function is considered not a function in itself but only about how it affects other functions when "integrated" against them. In keeping with this philosophy, to define the delta function properly, it is enough to say what the "integral" of the delta function is against a sufficiently "good" test function φ.  Test functions are also known as bump functions.  If the delta function is already understood as a measure, then the Lebesgue integral of a test function against that measure supplies the necessary integral.

A typical space of test functions consists of all smooth functions on R with compact support that have as many derivatives as required.  As a distribution, the Dirac delta is a linear functional on the space of test functions and is defined by

for every test function .

For δ to be properly a distribution, it must be continuous in a suitable topology on the space of test functions.  In general, for a linear functional S on the space of test functions to define a distribution, it is necessary and sufficient that, for every positive integer N there is an integer MN and a constant CN such that for every test function φ, one has the inequality

where sup represents the supremum. It is, furthermore, a distribution with compact support (the support being {0}).

The delta distribution can also be defined in several equivalent ways.  For instance, it is the distributional derivative of the Heaviside step function. This means that for every test function φ, one has

Intuitively, if integration by parts were permitted, then the latter integral should simplify to

and indeed, a form of integration by parts is permitted for the Stieltjes integral, and in that case, one does have

In the context of measure theory, the Dirac measure gives rise to distribution by integration.  Conversely, equation defines a Daniell integral on the space of all compactly supported continuous functions φ which, by the Riesz representation theorem, can be represented as the Lebesgue integral of φ concerning some Radon measure.

Generally, when the term "Dirac delta function" is used, it is in the sense of distributions rather than measures, the Dirac measure being among several terms for the corresponding notion in measure theory.  Some sources may also use the term Dirac delta distribution.

Generalizations
The delta function can be defined in n-dimensional Euclidean space Rn as the measure such that

for every compactly supported continuous function f. As a measure, the n-dimensional delta function is the product measure of the 1-dimensional delta functions in each variable separately.

The delta function can also be defined in the sense of distributions exactly as above in the one-dimensional case.  However, despite widespread use in engineering contexts, should be manipulated with care, since the product of distributions can only be defined under quite narrow circumstances.

The notion of a Dirac measure makes sense on any set. Thus if X is a set,  is a marked point, and Σ is any sigma algebra of subsets of X, then the measure defined on sets  by

is the delta measure or unit mass concentrated at x0.

Another common generalization of the delta function is to a differentiable manifold where most of its properties as a distribution can also be exploited because of the differentiable structure.  The delta function on a manifold M centered at the point  is defined as the following distribution:

for all compactly supported smooth real-valued functions φ on M. A common special case of this construction is a case in which M is an open set in the Euclidean space Rn.

On a locally compact Hausdorff space X, the Dirac delta measure concentrated at a point x is the Radon measure associated with the Daniell integral on compactly supported continuous functions φ. At this level of generality, calculus as such is no longer possible, however a variety of techniques from abstract analysis are available. For instance, the mapping  is a continuous embedding of X into the space of finite Radon measures on X, equipped with its vague topology. Moreover, the convex hull of the image of X under this embedding is dense in the space of probability measures on X.

Properties

Scaling and symmetry
The delta function satisfies the following scaling property for a non-zero scalar α:

and so

Scaling property proof:

In this proof, the delta function representation as the limit of the sequence of zero-centered normal distributions  is used. This proof can be made by using other delta function representations as the limits of sequences of functions, as long as these are even functions.

In particular, the delta function is an even distribution (symmetry), in the sense that

which is homogeneous of degree −1.

Algebraic properties
The distributional product of δ with x is equal to zero:

Conversely, if , where f and g are distributions, then

for some constant c.

Translation
The integral of the time-delayed Dirac delta is

This is sometimes referred to as the sifting property or the sampling property. The delta function is said to "sift out" the value of f(t) at t = T.

It follows that the effect of convolving a function f(t) with the time-delayed Dirac delta  is to time-delay f(t) by the same amount. This is sometimes referred to as the shifting property (not to be confused with the sifting property):

Note that the sifting property finds the value of a function centered at T whereas the shifting property returns a delayed function. The shifting property holds under the precise condition that f be a tempered distribution (see the discussion of the Fourier transform below). As a special case, for instance, we have the identity (understood in the distribution sense)

Composition with a function
More generally, the delta distribution may be composed with a smooth function g(x) in such a way that the familiar change of variables formula holds, that

provided that g is a continuously differentiable function with g′ nowhere zero. That is, there is a unique way to assign meaning to the distribution  so that this identity holds for all compactly supported test functions f.  Therefore, the domain must be broken up to exclude the g′ = 0 point.  This distribution satisfies  if g is nowhere zero, and otherwise if g has a real root at x0, then

It is natural therefore to define the composition δ(g(x)) for continuously differentiable functions g by

where the sum extends over all roots (i.e., all the different ones) of g(x), which are assumed to be simple.  Thus, for example

In the integral form, the generalized scaling property may be written as

Properties in n dimensions
The delta distribution in an n-dimensional space satisfies the following scaling property instead,

so that δ is a homogeneous distribution of degree −n.

Under any reflection or rotation ρ, the delta function is invariant,

As in the one-variable case, it is possible to define the composition of δ with a bi-Lipschitz function  uniquely so that the identity

for all compactly supported functions f.

Using the coarea formula from geometric measure theory, one can also define the composition of the delta function with a submersion from one Euclidean space to another one of different dimension; the result is a type of current. In the special case of a continuously differentiable function  such that the gradient of g is nowhere zero, the following identity holds
 
This is known as a simple layer integral.

More generally, if S is a smooth hypersurface of Rn, then we can associate to S the distribution that integrates any compactly supported smooth function g over S:

where σ is the hypersurface measure associated to S.  This generalization is associated with the potential theory of simple layer potentials on S.  If D is a domain in Rn with smooth boundary S, then δS is equal to the normal derivative of the indicator function of D in the distribution sense,

where n is the outward normal. For a proof, see e.g. the article on the surface delta function.

Fourier transform
The delta function is a tempered distribution, and therefore it has a well-defined Fourier transform.  Formally, one finds

Properly speaking, the Fourier transform of a distribution is defined by imposing self-adjointness of the Fourier transform under the duality pairing  of tempered distributions with Schwartz functions.  Thus  is defined as the unique tempered distribution satisfying

for all Schwartz functions . And indeed it follows from this that 

As a result of this identity, the convolution of the delta function with any other tempered distribution S is simply S:

That is to say that δ is an identity element for the convolution on tempered distributions, and in fact, the space of compactly supported distributions under convolution is an associative algebra with identity the delta function.  This property is fundamental in signal processing, as convolution with a tempered distribution is a linear time-invariant system, and applying the linear time-invariant system measures its impulse response.  The impulse response can be computed to any desired degree of accuracy by choosing a suitable approximation for δ, and once it is known, it characterizes the system completely. See .

The inverse Fourier transform of the tempered distribution f(ξ) = 1 is the delta function. Formally, this is expressed

and more rigorously, it follows since

for all Schwartz functions f.

In these terms, the delta function provides a suggestive statement of the orthogonality property of the Fourier kernel on R.  Formally, one has

This is, of course, shorthand for the assertion that the Fourier transform of the tempered distribution

is

which again follows by imposing self-adjointness of the Fourier transform.

By analytic continuation of the Fourier transform, the Laplace transform of the delta function is found to be

Derivatives of the Dirac delta function
The derivative of the Dirac delta distribution, denoted  and also called the Dirac delta prime or Dirac delta derivative as described in Laplacian of the indicator, is defined on compactly supported smooth test functions  by

The first equality here is a kind of integration by parts, for if  were a true function then

In particular,  is an infinitely differentiable distribution.

The first derivative of the delta function is the distributional limit of the difference quotients:

More properly, one has

In the theory of electromagnetism, the first derivative of the delta function represents a point magnetic dipole situated at the origin.  Accordingly, it is referred to as a dipole or the doublet function.

The derivative of the delta function satisfies a number of basic properties, including:

which can be shown by applying a test function and integrating by parts.

The latter of these properties can also be demonstrated by applying distributional derivative definition, Liebnitz's theorem and linearity of inner product:

which follows from the properties of the distributional derivative of a convolution.

Higher dimensions
More generally, on an open set  in the -dimensional Euclidean space , the Dirac delta distribution centered at a point  is defined by

The first partial derivatives of the delta function are thought of as double layers along the coordinate planes.  More generally, the normal derivative of a simple layer supported on a surface is a double layer supported on that surface and represents a laminar magnetic monopole.  Higher derivatives of the delta function are known in physics as multipoles.

Higher derivatives enter into mathematics naturally as the building blocks for the complete structure of distributions with point support.  If  is any distribution on  supported on the set  consisting of a single point, then there is an integer  and coefficients  such that

Representations of the delta function
The delta function can be viewed as the limit of a sequence of functions

where ηε(x) is sometimes called a nascent delta function. This limit is meant in a weak sense: either that

for all continuous functions f having compact support, or that this limit holds for all smooth functions f with compact support.  The difference between these two slightly different modes of weak convergence is often subtle: the former is convergence in the vague topology of measures, and the latter is convergence in the sense of distributions.

Approximations to the identity
Typically a nascent delta function ηε can be constructed in the following manner.  Let η be an absolutely integrable function on R of total integral 1, and define

In n dimensions, one uses instead the scaling

Then a simple change of variables shows that ηε also has integral 1.  One may show that holds for all continuous compactly supported functions f, and so ηε converges weakly to δ in the sense of measures.

The ηε constructed in this way are known as an approximation to the identity. This terminology is because the space L1(R) of absolutely integrable functions is closed under the operation of convolution of functions:  whenever f and g are in L1(R).  However, there is no identity in L1(R) for the convolution product: no element h such that  for all f.  Nevertheless, the sequence ηε does approximate such an identity in the sense that

This limit holds in the sense of mean convergence (convergence in L1).  Further conditions on the ηε, for instance that it be a mollifier associated to a compactly supported function, are needed to ensure pointwise convergence almost everywhere.

If the initial  is itself smooth and compactly supported then the sequence is called a mollifier.  The standard mollifier is obtained by choosing η to be a suitably normalized bump function, for instance

In some situations such as numerical analysis, a piecewise linear approximation to the identity is desirable.  This can be obtained by taking η1 to be a hat function.  With this choice of η1, one has

which are all continuous and compactly supported, although not smooth and so not a mollifier.

Probabilistic considerations
In the context of probability theory, it is natural to impose the additional condition that the initial η1 in an approximation to the identity should be positive, as such a function then represents a probability distribution. Convolution with a probability distribution is sometimes favorable because it does not result in overshoot or undershoot, as the output is a convex combination of the input values, and thus falls between the maximum and minimum of the input function. Taking η1 to be any probability distribution at all, and letting  as above will give rise to an approximation to the identity. In general this converges more rapidly to a delta function if, in addition, η has mean 0 and has small higher moments.

Another example is with the Wigner semicircle distribution

This is continuous and compactly supported, but not a mollifier because it is not smooth.

Semigroups
Nascent delta functions often arise as convolution semigroups. This amounts to the further constraint that the convolution of ηε with ηδ must satisfy

for all ε, .  Convolution semigroups in L1 that form a nascent delta function are always an approximation to the identity in the above sense, however the semigroup condition is quite a strong restriction.

In practice, semigroups approximating the delta function arise as fundamental solutions or Green's functions to physically motivated elliptic or parabolic partial differential equations.  In the context of applied mathematics, semigroups arise as the output of a linear time-invariant system.  Abstractly, if A is a linear operator acting on functions of x, then a convolution semigroup arises by solving the initial value problem

in which the limit is as usual understood in the weak sense.  Setting  gives the associated nascent delta function.

Some examples of physically important convolution semigroups arising from such a fundamental solution include the following.

 The heat kernel
The heat kernel, defined by

represents the temperature in an infinite wire at time t > 0, if a unit of heat energy is stored at the origin of the wire at time t = 0.  This semigroup evolves according to the one-dimensional heat equation:

In probability theory, ηε(x) is a normal distribution of variance ε and mean 0. It represents the probability density at time  of the position of a particle starting at the origin following a standard Brownian motion. In this context, the semigroup condition is then an expression of the Markov property of Brownian motion.

In higher-dimensional Euclidean space Rn, the heat kernel is

and has the same physical interpretation, mutatis mutandis.

The Poisson kernel
The Poisson kernel

is the fundamental solution of the Laplace equation in the upper half-plane.  It represents the electrostatic potential in a semi-infinite plate whose potential along the edge is held at fixed at the delta function. The Poisson kernel is also closely related to the Cauchy distribution and Epanechnikov and Gaussian kernel functions. This semigroup evolves according to the equation

where the operator is rigorously defined as the Fourier multiplier

Oscillatory integrals
In areas of physics such as wave propagation and wave mechanics, the equations involved are hyperbolic and so may have more singular solutions.  As a result, the nascent delta functions that arise as fundamental solutions of the associated Cauchy problems are generally oscillatory integrals.  An example, which comes from a solution of the Euler–Tricomi equation of transonic gas dynamics, is the rescaled Airy function

Although using the Fourier transform, it is easy to see that this generates a semigroup in some sense—it is not absolutely integrable and so cannot define a semigroup in the above strong sense.  Many nascent delta functions constructed as oscillatory integrals only converge in the sense of distributions (an example is the Dirichlet kernel below), rather than in the sense of measures.

Another example is the Cauchy problem for the wave equation in R1+1:

The solution u represents the displacement from equilibrium of an infinite elastic string, with an initial disturbance at the origin.

Other approximations to the identity of this kind include the sinc function (used widely in electronics and telecommunications)

and the Bessel function

Plane wave decomposition
One approach to the study of a linear partial differential equation

where L is a differential operator on Rn, is to seek first a fundamental solution, which is a solution of the equation

When L is particularly simple, this problem can often be resolved using the Fourier transform directly (as in the case of the Poisson kernel and heat kernel already mentioned).  For more complicated operators, it is sometimes easier first to consider an equation of the form

where h is a plane wave function, meaning that it has the form

for some vector ξ.  Such an equation can be resolved (if the coefficients of L are analytic functions) by the Cauchy–Kovalevskaya theorem or (if the coefficients of L are constant) by quadrature.  So, if the delta function can be decomposed into plane waves, then one can in principle solve linear partial differential equations.

Such a decomposition of the delta function into plane waves was part of a general technique first introduced essentially by Johann Radon, and then developed in this form by Fritz John (1955). Choose k so that  is an even integer, and for a real number s, put

The Laplacian here is interpreted as a weak derivative, so that this equation is taken to mean that, for any test function φ,

The result follows from the formula for the Newtonian potential (the fundamental solution of Poisson's equation). This is essentially a form of the inversion formula for the Radon transform because it recovers the value of φ(x) from its integrals over hyperplanes.

 

where  is the Radon transform of φ:

 

for n even, and

for n odd.

Fourier kernels

In the study of Fourier series, a major question consists of determining whether and in what sense the Fourier series associated with a periodic function converges to the function.  The nth partial sum of the Fourier series of a function f of period 2 is defined by convolution (on the interval ) with the Dirichlet kernel:

Thus,

where

This is interpreted in the distribution sense, that

for every compactly supported smooth function f.  Thus, formally one has

on the interval .

Despite this, the result does not hold for all compactly supported continuous functions: that is DN does not converge weakly in the sense of measures. The lack of convergence of the Fourier series has led to the introduction of a variety of summability methods to produce convergence.  The method of Cesàro summation leads to the Fejér kernel

The Fejér kernels tend to the delta function in a stronger sense that

for every compactly supported continuous function f.  The implication is that the Fourier series of any continuous function is Cesàro summable to the value of the function at every point.

Hilbert space theory
The Dirac delta distribution is a densely defined unbounded linear functional on the Hilbert space L2 of square-integrable functions.  Indeed, smooth compactly supported functions are dense in L2, and the action of the delta distribution on such functions is well-defined.  In many applications, it is possible to identify subspaces of L2 and to give a stronger topology on which the delta function defines a bounded linear functional.

 Sobolev spaces
The Sobolev embedding theorem for Sobolev spaces on the real line R implies that any square-integrable function f such that

is automatically continuous, and satisfies in particular

Thus δ is a bounded linear functional on the Sobolev space H1.  Equivalently δ is an element of the continuous dual space H−1 of H1. More generally, in n dimensions, one has  provided .

Spaces of holomorphic functions
In complex analysis, the delta function enters via Cauchy's integral formula, which asserts that if D is a domain in the complex plane with smooth boundary, then

for all holomorphic functions f in D that are continuous on the closure of D.  As a result, the delta function δz is represented in this class of holomorphic functions by the Cauchy integral:

Moreover, let H2(∂D) be the Hardy space consisting of the closure in L2(∂D) of all holomorphic functions in D continuous up to the boundary of D.  Then functions in H2(∂D) uniquely extend to holomorphic functions in D, and the Cauchy integral formula continues to hold. This is a special case of the situation in several complex variables in which, for smooth domains D, the Szegő kernel plays the role of the Cauchy integral.

Resolutions of the identity
Given a complete orthonormal basis set of functions {φn} in a separable Hilbert space, for example, the normalized eigenvectors of a compact self-adjoint operator, any vector f can be expressed as

The coefficients {αn} are found as

which may be represented by the notation:

a form of the bra–ket notation of Dirac. Adopting this notation, the expansion of f takes the dyadic form:

Letting I denote the identity operator on the Hilbert space, the expression

is called a resolution of the identity. When the Hilbert space is the space L2(D) of square-integrable functions on a domain D, the quantity:

is an integral operator, and the expression for f can be rewritten

The right-hand side converges to f in the L2 sense.  It need not hold in a pointwise sense, even when f is a continuous function.  Nevertheless, it is common to abuse notation and write

resulting in the representation of the delta function:

With a suitable rigged Hilbert space  where  contains all compactly supported smooth functions, this summation may converge in Φ*, depending on the properties of the basis φn.  In most cases of practical interest, the orthonormal basis comes from an integral or differential operator, in which case the series converges in the distribution sense.

Infinitesimal delta functions
Cauchy used an infinitesimal α to write down a unit impulse, infinitely tall and narrow Dirac-type delta function δα satisfying  in a number of articles in 1827. Cauchy defined an infinitesimal in Cours d'Analyse (1827) in terms of a sequence tending to zero.  Namely, such a null sequence becomes an infinitesimal in Cauchy's and Lazare Carnot's terminology.

Non-standard analysis allows one to rigorously treat infinitesimals. The article by  contains a bibliography on modern Dirac delta functions in the context of an infinitesimal-enriched continuum provided by the hyperreals.  Here the Dirac delta can be given by an actual function, having the property that for every real function F one has  as anticipated by Fourier and Cauchy.

Dirac comb

A so-called uniform "pulse train" of Dirac delta measures, which is known as a Dirac comb, or as the Sha distribution, creates a sampling function, often used in digital signal processing (DSP) and discrete time signal analysis.  The Dirac comb is given as the infinite sum, whose limit is understood in the distribution sense,

which is a sequence of point masses at each of the integers.

Up to an overall normalizing constant, the Dirac comb is equal to its own Fourier transform.

In particular,

is precisely the Poisson summation formula.
More generally, this formula remains to be true if  is a tempered distribution of rapid descent or, equivalently, if  is a slowly growing, ordinary function within the space of tempered distributions.

Sokhotski–Plemelj theorem
The Sokhotski–Plemelj theorem, important in quantum mechanics, relates the delta function to the distribution p.v. 1/x, the Cauchy principal value of the function 1/x, defined by

Sokhotsky's formula states that

Here the limit is understood in the distribution sense, that for all compactly supported smooth functions f,

Relationship to the Kronecker delta
The Kronecker delta δij is the quantity defined by

for all integers i, j.  This function then satisfies the following analog of the sifting property: if  is any doubly infinite sequence, then

Similarly, for any real or complex valued continuous function f on R, the Dirac delta satisfies the sifting property

This exhibits the Kronecker delta function as a discrete analog of the Dirac delta function.

Applications

Probability theory
In probability theory and statistics, the Dirac delta function is often used to represent a discrete distribution, or a partially discrete, partially continuous distribution, using a probability density function (which is normally used to represent absolutely continuous distributions).  For example, the probability density function f(x) of a discrete distribution consisting of points x = {x1, ..., xn}, with corresponding probabilities p1, ..., pn, can be written as

As another example, consider a distribution in which 6/10 of the time returns a standard normal distribution, and 4/10 of the time returns exactly the value 3.5 (i.e. a partly continuous, partly discrete mixture distribution).  The density function of this distribution can be written as

The delta function is also used to represent the resulting probability density function of a random variable that is transformed by continuously differentiable function. If Y = g(X) is a continuous differentiable function, then the density of Y can be written as

The delta function is also used in a completely different way to represent the local time of a diffusion process (like Brownian motion).  The local time of a stochastic process B(t) is given by

and represents the amount of time that the process spends at the point x in the range of the process.  More precisely, in one dimension this integral can be written

where  is the indicator function of the interval .

Quantum mechanics
The delta function is expedient in quantum mechanics. The wave function of a particle gives the probability amplitude of finding a particle within a given region of space.  Wave functions are assumed to be elements of the Hilbert space L2 of square-integrable functions, and the total probability of finding a particle within a given interval is the integral of the magnitude of the wave function squared over the interval. A set {} of wave functions is orthonormal if they are normalized by

where  is the Kronecker delta.  A set of orthonormal wave functions is complete in the space of square-integrable functions if any wave function  can be expressed as a linear combination of the {} with complex coefficients:

 

Complete orthonormal systems of wave functions appear naturally as the eigenfunctions of the Hamiltonian (of a bound system) in quantum mechanics that measures the energy levels, which are called the eigenvalues. The set of eigenvalues, in this case, is known as the spectrum of the Hamiltonian. In bra–ket notation, as above, this equality implies the resolution of the identity:

 

Here the eigenvalues are assumed to be discrete, but the set of eigenvalues of an observable may be continuous rather than discrete.  An example is the position observable, .  The spectrum of the position (in one dimension) is the entire real line and is called a continuous spectrum.  However, unlike the Hamiltonian, the position operator lacks proper eigenfunctions.  The conventional way to overcome this shortcoming is to widen the class of available functions by allowing distributions as well: that is, to replace the Hilbert space of quantum mechanics with an appropriate rigged Hilbert space.  In this context, the position operator has a complete set of eigen-distributions, labeled by the points y of the real line, given by

Similar considerations apply to the eigenstates of the momentum operator, or indeed any other self-adjoint unbounded operator P on the Hilbert space, provided the spectrum of P is continuous and there are no degenerate eigenvalues.  In that case, there is a set Ω of real numbers (the spectrum), and a collection φy of distributions indexed by the elements of Ω, such that

That is, φy are the eigenvectors of P.  If the eigenvectors are normalized so that

in the distribution sense, then for any test function ψ,

 

where

 

That is, as in the discrete case, there is a resolution of the identity

where the operator-valued integral is again understood in the weak sense.  If the spectrum of P has both continuous and discrete parts, then the resolution of the identity involves a summation over the discrete spectrum and an integral over the continuous spectrum.

The delta function also has many more specialized applications in quantum mechanics, such as the delta potential models for a single and double potential well.

Structural mechanics
The delta function can be used in structural mechanics to describe transient loads or point loads acting on structures. The governing equation of a simple mass–spring system excited by a sudden force impulse I at time t = 0 can be written

where m is the mass, ξ the deflection and k the spring constant.

As another example, the equation governing the static deflection of a slender beam is, according to Euler–Bernoulli theory,

where EI is the bending stiffness of the beam, w the deflection, x the spatial coordinate and q(x) the load distribution. If a beam is loaded by a point force F at x = x0, the load distribution is written

As the integration of the delta function results in the Heaviside step function, it follows that the static deflection of a slender beam subject to multiple point loads is described by a set of piecewise polynomials.

Also, a point moment acting on a beam can be described by delta functions. Consider two opposing point forces F at a distance d apart. They then produce a moment M = Fd acting on the beam. Now, let the distance d approach the limit zero, while M is kept constant. The load distribution, assuming a clockwise moment acting at x = 0, is written

Point moments can thus be represented by the derivative of the delta function. Integration of the beam equation again results in piecewise polynomial deflection.

See also
Atom (measure theory)
Laplacian of the indicator

Notes

References
.
.
 
 .
 .
 .
 .

.

.
.
.
 .
 .
.
.
 
 
.
.
 .
.
.
.
.

.
.
.
.
 
 .
 .

 .
 .
 .
 .
 .

External links

KhanAcademy.org video lesson
The Dirac Delta function, a tutorial on the Dirac delta function.
Video Lectures – Lecture 23, a lecture by Arthur Mattuck.
The Dirac delta measure is a hyperfunction
We show the existence of a unique solution and analyze a finite element approximation when the source term is a Dirac delta measure
Non-Lebesgue measures on R. Lebesgue-Stieltjes measure, Dirac delta measure. 

Fourier analysis
Generalized functions
Measure theory
Digital signal processing
Delta function
Schwartz distributions